Gordon R. Sherven (born August 21, 1963) is a Canadian former professional ice hockey forward. He played 97 games in the National Hockey League with the Edmonton Oilers, Minnesota North Stars, and Hartford Whalers between 1984 and 1988. He later moved to Germany and played there from 1988 to 2000. Internationally Sherven played for the Canadian national team at the 1983 World Junior and senior World Championships, as well as the 1988 Winter Olympics.

Playing career
Sherven was born in Gravelbourg, Saskatchewan and raised in Mankota, Saskatchewan. He was selected by the Edmonton Oilers in the tenth round of the 1981 NHL Entry Draft. He played three seasons of collegiate hockey for the University of North Dakota from 1981–84, including the championship team of the 1982 NCAA Men's Division I Ice Hockey Tournament. He also played for the Canada national junior hockey team that won the bronze medal at the 1983 World Junior Ice Hockey Championships and the senior national team that won the bronze medal at the 1983 World Ice Hockey Championships only four months later. Only on two other occasions have Canadian players played for both the junior team and the senior team in the same year.

Sherven made his National Hockey League debut in the 1983–84 season, playing in only two games with the Oilers and scoring one goal. He played in 37 games with the club the following season, and also played 5 games with the minor league affiliate Nova Scotia Oilers. He was traded to the Minnesota North Stars mid-season, and played in 32 regular season games and 3 playoff games for the North Stars. In 1985–86, he was traded back to the Oilers, but spent most of that season in Nova Scotia. He was claimed by the Hartford Whalers before the 1986–87 season, but only played 7 games with the team that season, and a single game in the following season.

Sherven played for the Canadian national team for most of the 1986–87 and 1987–88 seasons. At the time, professionals were allowed to compete in the Olympic Games, but full-time NHL players were not released from their club teams to play for their national teams. Therefore, the Canadian national team typically included top NHL prospects and veteran pros with NHL experience, and they played full seasons together all over the world against both national and club teams in preparation for the Games. Sherven was a member of the Canadian team that finished fourth in ice hockey at the 1988 Winter Olympics, held in Calgary.

Sherven moved to Germany for the 1988–89 season, and spent the next twelve years playing for several teams in the Deutsche Eishockey Liga, including the Star Bulls Rosenheim and Düsseldorfer EG. He retired at the end of the 1999–2000 season.

Career statistics

Regular season and playoffs

International

References

External links

1963 births
Living people
Canadian expatriate ice hockey players in Germany
Canadian ice hockey forwards
Düsseldorfer EG players
Edmonton Oilers draft picks
Edmonton Oilers players
Hartford Whalers players
Ice hockey people from Saskatchewan
Ice hockey players at the 1988 Winter Olympics
Mad Dogs München players
Minnesota North Stars players
NCAA men's ice hockey national champions
North Dakota Fighting Hawks men's ice hockey players
Nova Scotia Oilers players
Olympic ice hockey players of Canada
People from Gravelbourg, Saskatchewan
Springfield Indians players
Starbulls Rosenheim players
Weyburn Red Wings players